Bryson is a village and municipality in the Pontiac Regional County Municipality in the Outaouais region of Quebec, Canada. It is located on the northern bank of the Ottawa River.

History
From 1858 to 1873, the village was called Havelock in honor of British general Henry Havelock (1795-1857). Because another Havelock Township had already been incorporated two years prior in the province of Quebec, Havelock was renamed in 1873 after local lumber baron and politician George Bryson when the Municipality of the Village of Bryson was incorporated.

On December 20, 2004, it changed status from Village Municipality to (regular) Municipality.

Demographics

Local government
List of former mayors:

 Léo Piché (1969–1990)
James Stewart (2001–2005)
 Albert Davis (2005–2009)
 John Griffin (2009–2013)
 Alain Gagnon (2013–present)

See also
 List of municipalities in Quebec

References

External links

 Elections Canada Results - 39th General Election (2006)
 Director General of Quebec Elections
 Official Transport Quebec Road Map

Incorporated places in Outaouais
Municipalities in Quebec